The China Ladies Open is a women's professional golf tournament in China sanctioned by the China LPGA Tour and formerly the LPGA of Korea Tour.

The tournament, which is China's national championship, debuted in 2006. Lin Xiyu became the first mainland winner in 2019.

Winners

References

External links

LPGA of Korea Tour events
China LPGA Tour events
Golf tournaments in China
Recurring sporting events established in 2006
2006 establishments in China